The 2016–17 Ukrainian Basketball SuperLeague is the 2016–17 edition of the Ukrainian basketball championship., the first after merging the two leagues in the previous season.

Teams
Eleven teams play in the 2016–17 season.

Regular season

Playoffs

Ukrainian clubs in European competitions

References

External links
Official Superleague website

Ukrainian Basketball SuperLeague seasons
1
Ukraine